The 2016 Renault Sport Trophy was the second and final season of the Renault–supported sports car category, a one-make racing series that is part of the Renault Sport Series. The season began at Ciudad del Motor de Aragón on 16 April and finished on 23 October at Autódromo do Estoril. The series forms part of the Renault Sport Series meetings at six triple header events.

Teams and drivers

Race calendar and results
The provisional calendar for the 2016 season was announced on 5 September 2015. Rounds at Imola, Spielberg, Le Castellet and Estoril will début in the series' calendar. All rounds will be collaboration with European Le Mans Series, except Aragón which will feature the Formula 3.5 V8.

Championship standings

Pro Class

Am Class

Endurance Trophy

Teams' Championship

References

External links
 Renault-Sport official website

Renault Sport Trophy
Renault Sport Trophy
Renault Sport Trophy